Sinnemahoning Creek is a  tributary of the West Branch Susquehanna River in Cameron and Clinton counties, Pennsylvania, in the United States.

Sinnemahoning Creek (meaning "stony lick" in the Lenape language) is formed by the confluence of the Bennett and Driftwood branches at the borough of Driftwood.

Sinnemahoning Creek continues  to join the West Branch Susquehanna River at the village of Keating.

See also
Kettle Creek (Pennsylvania)
List of rivers of Pennsylvania

References

External links
U.S. Geological Survey: PA stream gaging stations

Rivers of Cameron County, Pennsylvania
Rivers of Clinton County, Pennsylvania
Rivers of Elk County, Pennsylvania
Rivers of Potter County, Pennsylvania
Rivers of Pennsylvania
Tributaries of the West Branch Susquehanna River